Lukáš Třešňák (born 3 May 1988) is a professional Czech football player who most recently played for Simurq.

Career
In August 2014, Třešňák signed for Azerbaijan Premier League side Simurq, but was released by Sumurq in December of the same year after only eight appearances.

References

1988 births
Living people
Czech footballers
Czech First League players
AC Sparta Prague players
FK Jablonec players
Association football forwards